The Woodwrae Stone (alternatively the Woodwray Stone) is a Class II Pictish Stone (c. 8th or 9th century) that was found in 1819 when the foundations of the old castle at Woodwrae, Angus, Scotland were cleared. It had been reused as a floor slab in the kitchen of the castle. Following its removal from the castle, it was donated to the collection of Sir Walter Scott at Abbotsford House. It is now on display at the Museum of Scotland in Edinburgh.

Location
The stone was used as a floor slab at the castle and was removed in 1819 to the collection of Sir Walter Scott at Abbotsford House  where it resided until it was donated to the Society of Antiquaries of Scotland in 1924.

Description

The slab is carved on both faces in relief and, as it bears Pictish symbols, it falls into John Romilly Allen and Joseph Anderson's classification system as a class II stone.

The cross face formerly bore a lobed cross, which has been deliberately erased, although the borders, decorated with interlaced knotwork, keywork and divergent spiral work remain. Also remaining intact are the fantastic creatures in the four quadrants surrounding the cross, including a beast with human legs dangling from its mouth, a feature that exists on other Pictish cross slabs, including the Dunfallandy Stone, as well as Irish High crosses.

The reverse face has suffered considerable mutilation. It is divided into three sections. The upper section bears a horseman, a Pictish double disc symbol and a step symbol. The lower two thirds of the face holds a second horseman and a variety of other animals, including a bull.

Relationship with other sculptured stones

This close proximity, and the similarity with the Class II slabs at Aberlemno has long been noted and it has been suggested that the stone originated there. Historian Ross Trench-Jellicoe has postulated, based on similarity of design and execution, an Aberlemno School of Pictish Sculpture, originating from Iona. Stones in the Aberlemno School include Aberlemno 2 (the Kirkyard Stone), Aberlemno 3, Menmuir 1, Kirriemuir 1 and Monifieth 2. To this list, Lloyd Laing has added the stones of Eassie, Rossie Priory, Glamis 1 and Glamis 2.

References

Pictish stones
Collections of the National Museums of Scotland
Pictish stones in Angus, Scotland